Espa is a village in Hedmark, Norway. It can also refer to the following:
Esplanadi, colloquially called Espa, a park in Helsinki, Finland
Etelä-Espoon Pallo, abbreviated EsPa, a sports club in Espoo, Finland
EELV Secondary Payload Adapter, abbreviated ESPA, a transport facility for orbital carriers